Always & Forever is the debut studio album by British girl group Eternal. It was released through EMI on 29 November 1993 before Louise Nurding left to embark on a solo career prior to the release of the follow up album, Power of a Woman (1995). The album became a commercial success, spending 63 weeks in the top 40 of the UK Albums Chart, selling over one million copies in the UK alone and yielding six hit singles. As of 1997, the album had sold over four million copies worldwide. In June 2019, Always & Forever was ranked at number 15 on the Official Charts Company's Top 40 biggest girl band studio albums of the last 25 years.

Single releases
Always & Forever yielded six top 20 singles, two of which reached top 5: "Stay" and "Oh Baby I...". "Stay" was the first single to be released from the album, peaking at No. 4 in the UK Singles Chart. This was followed by "Save Our Love" and "Just A Step From Heaven", both of which peaked at No. 8. "So Good" was the next single, peaking at No. 13, followed by "Oh Baby I..." which reached No. 4. "Crazy" was the final single released from the album, peaking at No. 15 in the UK Singles Chart.

Commercial performance
Always & Forever was a huge success, peaking at number 2 on the UK Albums Chart, and was later certified 4× Platinum by the BPI for sales of over 1.2 million copies. The album spent over 76 weeks in the charts. After its release at the end of 1993, it slowly climbed the album chart peaking at No. 3 in May 1994 shortly after the release of the third single, "Just A Step From Heaven". The album stayed in the chart throughout 1994 becoming that year's third best-selling album in the UK, before climbing to No. 2 in January 1995. The album broke records for being the first to sell over one million copies in the UK by a female group. As of 2015, it is the only album by a debut act to contain six top 15 hits and the first album by a female group to be nominated for best album at the BRIT Awards. The album had an American release in March 1994, selling 81,000 copies by December 1994.

Track listing

Charts

Weekly charts

Year-end charts

Certifications

References 

Eternal (band) albums
1993 debut albums
EMI Records albums
New jack swing albums